Alan Keith Campbell (May 31, 1923 – February 4, 1998) was the first Director of the United States Office of Personnel Management.

Career
Campbell, affectionately known as Scotty, served as a professor and later the dean (1969-1976) of the Maxwell School of Citizenship and Public Affairs at Syracuse University. Before arriving at Maxwell, Campbell was the deputy controller of the State of New York for two years.
Campbell was also the chair of the United States Civil Service Commission.

Campbell died from emphysema in Haverford, Pennsylvania in 1998 at the age of 74.

Books

References

Harvard University alumni
Wayne State University alumni
Syracuse University faculty
Public administration scholars
1923 births
1998 deaths
Directors of the United States Office of Personnel Management